Charles Lehmback Farmstead is a historic home located near Garrett in Keyser Township, DeKalb County, Indiana.  It was built in 1911, and is a two-story, Queen Anne-style frame dwelling with a one-story shed roofed addition. It has a one-story wraparound porch.

It was added to the National Register of Historic Places in 1983.

References

Houses on the National Register of Historic Places in Indiana
Queen Anne architecture in Indiana
Houses completed in 1911
Houses in DeKalb County, Indiana
National Register of Historic Places in DeKalb County, Indiana